Yann Claudepierre (born 20 November 1984) is a French male canoeist who won 16 medals at senior level at the Wildwater Canoeing World Championships.

References

External links
 Yann Claudepierre at Aifck

1984 births
Living people
French male canoeists